Deez Nuts was a satirical presidential candidate, portrayed by Brady C. Olson (born ), who ran in the 2016 United States presidential election. His form to run for office was filed with the Federal Election Commission in late July 2015. In polls conducted by Public Policy Polling in Iowa, Minnesota, and North Carolina in mid-August 2015, he polled at 8, 8, and 9 percent respectively, garnering the attention of the media. 

On October 11, 2015, Deez Nuts announced on his Facebook page his intention to run for Speaker of the United States House of Representatives, citing his eligibility despite not being a member of the House itself and the scarcity of candidates. A poll performed in mid-August 2016 showed Deez Nuts slightly edging out Jill Stein and Harambe—the latter of whom was a deceased gorilla—in Texas with 3% of the vote.

Nuts' bid for the presidency drew attention to the number of questionable candidates who had filed to run for office.  Jim Williams, an analyst at Public Policy Polling, the organization that had conducted the poll in North Carolina, noted to The Guardian that, due to a fringe of the population with a penchant towards anti-establishment candidates, "You could call [the third party candidate] anything, and they would get their 7% or 8%."

It was revealed on August 19, 2015 that "Deez Nuts" was 15-year-old Brady C. Olson of Wallingford, Iowa. He stated, in an interview with Rolling Stone magazine, that he created the practical joke "half-trying to break the two-party system, half-frustration with the front-runners." Olson also endorsed Vermont Senator Bernie Sanders for the Democratic nomination and Ohio Governor John Kasich for the Republican nomination. Olson has expressed libertarian views. Olson did not meet the minimum age requirement of 35 years at the time of inauguration to be able to serve as president if elected following the 2016 elections, according to Section 1 of Article Two of the United States Constitution.

In August 2016, the Federal Election Commission announced its intent to punish future satirical candidates for president for false filings with a federal agency.

Endorsements
Deez Nuts was endorsed by hip-hop artist Warren G, who had created the original skit "Deeez Nuuuts" as part of a song on Dr. Dre's album The Chronic. Rapper Ice-T also endorsed Deez Nuts.

Deez Nuts endorsed Bernie Sanders and John Kasich for the respective 2016 Democratic and Republican presidential nominations.

Polling
Deez Nuts first gained media attention from being included in a Public Policy Polling survey as a joke.

Nationwide

Statewide

North Carolina

Texas

Utah

Aftermath
Olson later enrolled at the University of Iowa to study finance. In 2019, he told The Gazette, "I don't foresee ever running again."

References

Living people
People from Emmet County, Iowa
2015 in American politics
American libertarians
Iowa Independents
Practical jokes
Candidates in the 2016 United States presidential election
21st-century American politicians
Year of birth missing (living people)